Derby County Reserves and Academy are the youth teams of Derby County. The reserve team is made up of under-23 players, and is effectively Derby County's second-string side. The under-18 players among other younger age groups make up the academy team. They play in the Premier League 2 Division 2, the second tier of reserve team football in England, after relegation from Division 1 in 2022. Derby's academy is Category 1, the highest classification in England under the Elite Player Performance Plan.

Under-21 squad

Under-18 squad

References

External links
 Derby County Under-23s at dcfc.co.uk
 Derby County Under-18s at dcfc.co.uk

Reserves
Football academies in England
Premier League International Cup
The Central League
UEFA Youth League teams